Mike Mangan (born November 3, 1975, in Chicago, Illinois) is a former American rugby union lock. He was a member of the United States national rugby union team that participated in the 2007 Rugby World Cup.

References

1975 births
Living people
Rugby union props
American rugby union players
United States international rugby union players